The Man They Could Not Hang is a 1939 American horror film starring Boris Karloff.

The Man They Could Not Hang may also refer to:

 John Babbacombe Lee, an Englishman also known as "The Man They Could Not Hang"
 The Man They Could Not Hang (play), a 1911 play based on Lee's life
 The Life Story of John Lee, or The Man They Could Not Hang (1912 film), an Australian silent film based on the play
 The Life Story of John Lee, or The Man They Could Not Hang (1921 film), an Australian silent film remake of the 1912 film
 The Man They Could Not Hang (1934 film), an Australian film based on Lee's life
 The Man They Could Not Hang (book), a 2005 book about Lee's life